Dem Franchize Boyz is the self-titled debut album by American hip hop group Dem Franchize Boyz. It produced one single, "White Tee," which was a major southern hit.

Track listing

References

2004 debut albums
Dem Franchize Boyz albums
Virgin Records albums